A  is a big clay mixing bowl with a rough surface. With the help of a special (usually wooden, rarely porcelain) grinding stick with a ball-shaped end, a makitra can be used for creaming cake batter, eggs with sugar, buttercream, quark for cheese cake, and poppy seeds for kutia.  It is perhaps most used in Eastern European kitchens, for example in Poland and Ukraine.

A similar tool, called suribashi, is used in Japanese cuisine.

References 

Kitchenware
Eastern Europe